Hubert John B. Ferriols (born September 9, 1974 in Davao City, Philippines) is a Filipino former professional basketball player. He last played for the Meralco Bolts of the Philippine Basketball Association (PBA). Ferriols was a former star in the defunct Metropolitan Basketball Association (MBA).

Professional career

Metropolitan Basketball Association (MBA)
Ferriols started his career with the Negros Slashers of the now-defunct Metropolitan Basketball Association (MBA). Ferriols was declared as the league's MVP in the league's inaugural season. He led the Slashers to its only title in the MBA during the 2002 season, MBA's final season. He played for five years with the Slashers, from the league's establishment to its folding in 2002. In the MBA, Ferriols was one of the league's star players and became the face of the Slashers franchise.

Philippine Basketball Association (PBA)
After the MBA folded, Ferriols entered the Philippine Basketball Association (PBA). He was drafted by the FedEx Express twelfth overall in the 2003 PBA draft.

Ferriols has played for eight teams in the PBA. He started his career with the Air21 Express and then with Talk 'N Text Phone Pals.

While playing for the Alaska Aces, he was provided sufficient playing time, and improved with the coaching of Tim Cone.

Ferriols was signed by the Barangay Ginebra Kings for the 2010 PBA Fiesta Conference. After he was waived by Barangay Ginebra, the Rain or Shine Elasto Painters then signed him.

In September 2011, before the start of 2011–12 PBA season, Ferriols was signed by B-Meg Llamados.

In 2012, Ferriols was signed by Talk 'N Text Tropang Texters. However, his contract was not renewed by Talk 'N Text and was released during the 2013–14 season.

In 2014, Ferriols was signed as a free agent by the Meralco Bolts.

ASEAN Basketball League
Ferriols was signed by San Miguel Beermen of the ASEAN Basketball League (ABL) for the 2012 ABL season.

PBA career statistics

Correct as October 19, 2016

Season-by-season averages

|-
| align=left | 
| align=left | FedEx
| 42 || 22.4 || .486 || .000 || .525 || 6.2 || .9 || .6 || .6 || 8.5
|-
| align=left | 
| align=left | FedEx
| 59 || 26.2 || .476 || .000 || .585 || 7.1 || 1.5 || .7 || .4 || 10.8
|-
| align=left | 
| align=left | Air21 / Talk 'N Text
| 32 || 11.9 || .436 || .000 || .569 || 3.8 || .4 || .2 || .2 || 5.2
|-
| align=left | 
| align=left | Alaska
| 28 || 16.7 || .443 || .000 || .485 || 5.3 || .6 || .3 || .3 || 5.9
|-
| align=left | 
| align=left | Alaska
| 51 || 20.0 || .492 || .000 || .536 || 6.4 || 1.2 || .4 || .2 || 8.2
|-
| align=left | 
| align=left | Alaska
| 46 || 19.7 || .504 || .000 || .646 || 6.4 || 1.1 || .4 || .2 || 7.5
|-
| align=left | 
| align=left | Alaska
| 45 || 14.1 || .470 || .000 || .673 || 3.9 || 1.0 || .3 || .1 || 4.6
|-
| align=left | 
| align=left | Alaska / Burger King
| 27 || 10.4 || .700 || .000 || .722 || 2.2 || .9 || .0 || .1 || 2.6
|-
| align=left | 
| align=left | Barangay Ginebra / Rain or Shine
| 27 || 9.6 || .454 || .000 || .636 || 2.5 || .5 || .1 || .2 || 3.4
|-
| align=left | 
| align=left | B-Meg
| 6 || 5.0 || .600 || .000 || .667 || 1.3 || .2 || .3 || .3 || 2.3
|-
| align=left | 
| align=left | Talk 'N Text
| 26 || 6.2 || .500 || .000 || .643 || 2.0 || .2 || .1 || .1 || 2.2
|-
| align=left | 
| align=left | Talk 'N Text
| 6 || 4.3 || .500 || .000 || 1.000 || 1.5 || .2 || .0 || .0 || 1.5
|-
| align=left | 
| align=left | Meralco
| 32 || 9.7 || .526 || .000 || .643 || 1.8 || .5 || .3 || .1 || 2.8
|-
| align=left | 
| align=left | Meralco
| 12 || 6.1 || .588 || .000 || .000 || 1.5 || .3 || .2 || .1 || 1.7
|-class=sortbottom
| align=center colspan=2 | Career
| 439 || 16.0 || .484 || .000 || .586 || 4.6 || .9 || .3 || .2 || 6.0

References

External links
Profile at pba.ph

1974 births
Living people
Alaska Aces (PBA) players
Barako Bull Energy players
Barangay Ginebra San Miguel players
Magnolia Hotshots players
Meralco Bolts players
Philippine Basketball Association All-Stars
Philippines men's national basketball team players
Filipino men's basketball players
Power forwards (basketball)
Rain or Shine Elasto Painters players
Basketball players from Davao City
TNT Tropang Giga players
USJ-R Jaguars basketball players
Barako Bull Energy draft picks